Beauford is a British family run automobile company based in Biddulph, Stoke on Trent. The cars are supplied in kit form and are therefore highly customisable. Beauford are founding members of S.T.A.T.U.S. (Specialist Transport Advisory and Testing Utility Society).

History
Originally based in Upholland, Lancashire the company later moved to Stoke on Trent. 
The first cars were made in 1985 and used a Mini bodyshell as the passenger compartment later replaced by a glass fibre moulding. The company has supplied over 1,500 kits.

Design
The Beauford Tourer is designed to look like a vintage car. At the front is a long bonnet with flowing wings at either side to give the appearance of a 1930s Style Grand Tourer luxury car. There are both 2 door and 4 door versions. Cars come in both open and closed bodies. With detachable hard top or convertible soft top there are also half soft-top versions. Because of the classic look of the vehicles the cars have become popular as wedding transport.They are suited to Rover V8 engines, and the M119 5 liter Mercedes Benz engine with over 300 BHP and high torque.

Technical
The shell of the body is made of Glass Reinforced Plastic (GRP), and the bonnet and panels are alloys. The body is mounted on a ladder chassis. The vehicles have a long wheel base of 3.2 m (126"). A variety of power units can be fitted to the kit, including Ford, Nissan and Rover. The suspension, steering, pedal box and master cylinder can be sourced from the Ford Sierra.
The manufacturer provides multiple choice in body parts such as windscreens and lights, meaning there are many unique vehicles in circulation.

Specifications

The Beauford Club
There is an owners club known as The Beauford Club. They attend automotive events and produce publications for members.

References

External links
Company website
Owners club
 

Car manufacturers of the United Kingdom
Kit car manufacturers